Two ships of the United States Navy have borne the name USS Makin Island, named for Makin Island, target of the U.S. Marine Raiders' raid early in World War II.

She was launched on 15 Sep 2006 and was commissioned in October 2009.

United States Navy ship names